The meridian 4° east of Greenwich is a line of longitude that extends from the North Pole across the Arctic Ocean, the Atlantic Ocean, Europe, Africa, the Southern Ocean, and Antarctica to the South Pole.

The 4th meridian east forms a great circle with the 176th meridian west.

From Pole to Pole
Starting at the North Pole and heading south to the South Pole, the 4th meridian east passes through:

{| class="wikitable plainrowheaders"
! scope="col" width="125" | Co-ordinates
! scope="col" | Country, territory or sea
! scope="col" | Notes
|-
| style="background:#b0e0e6;" | 
! scope="row" style="background:#b0e0e6;" | Arctic Ocean
| style="background:#b0e0e6;" |
|-
| style="background:#b0e0e6;" | 
! scope="row" style="background:#b0e0e6;" | Atlantic Ocean
| style="background:#b0e0e6;" |
|-
| style="background:#b0e0e6;" | 
! scope="row" style="background:#b0e0e6;" | North Sea
| style="background:#b0e0e6;" |
|-valign="top"
| 
! scope="row" | 
| Islands of Goeree-Overflakkee and Schouwen-Duiveland Peninsulas of Tholen and Zuid-Beveland Zeelandic Flanders
|-
| 
! scope="row" | 
|
|-
| 
! scope="row" | 
| Passing just west of Reims (at )
|-
| style="background:#b0e0e6;" | 
! scope="row" style="background:#b0e0e6;" | Mediterranean Sea
| style="background:#b0e0e6;" |
|-
| 
! scope="row" | 
| Island of Menorca
|-
| style="background:#b0e0e6;" | 
! scope="row" style="background:#b0e0e6;" | Mediterranean Sea
| style="background:#b0e0e6;" |
|-
| 
! scope="row" | 
|
|-
| 
! scope="row" | 
|
|-
| 
! scope="row" | 
| For about 8 km
|-
| 
! scope="row" | 
| For about 5 km
|-
| 
! scope="row" | 
| 
|-
| 
! scope="row" | 
|
|-
| style="background:#b0e0e6;" | 
! scope="row" style="background:#b0e0e6;" | Atlantic Ocean
| style="background:#b0e0e6;" |
|-
| style="background:#b0e0e6;" | 
! scope="row" style="background:#b0e0e6;" | Southern Ocean
| style="background:#b0e0e6;" |
|-
| 
! scope="row" | Antarctica
| Queen Maud Land, claimed by 
|-
|}

e004th meridian east